Cabbage Patch Dreams is the first album by the Cabbage Patch Kids, released in 1984 by Parker Brothers Music, which tries to put together a storyline for them.

Track listing
Side 1
 "Cabbage Patch Theme" (T. Chapin, S. Chapin) (1:52)
 "Babyland" (John Forster) (2:46)
 "Villains Three" (T. Chapin, S. Chapin) (3:36)
 "Good Ole Otis Lee" (R. M. Sherman, R. B. Sherman) (1:55)
 "Happy Birthday Hoe-Down" (R. M. Sherman, R. B. Sherman) (2:30)
Side 2
 "The BunnyBee Song" (R. M. Sherman, R. B. Sherman) (2:18)
 "Get Back Home" (John Carney) (2:04)
 "Run, Run, Run" (T. Chapin, S. Chapin) (3:46)
 "Cabbage Patch Dreams" (R. M. Sherman, R. B. Sherman) (2:07)
 "Cabbage Patch Parade" (R. M. Sherman, R. B. Sherman) (2:30)
Source:

Vocals
 D'Jamin Bartlett - Lavender McDade
 Jen Chapin - Rachel-Marie
 Stephen Chapin - Backing Vocals
 Tom Chapin - Backing Vocals
 Jessica Craven - 'Kid
 Rebecca Feit - 'Kid
 Ari Gold - Sybil Sadie
 Russell Horton - Beau Weasel
 Knowl Johnson - 'Kid
 John Henry Kurtz - Colonel Casey, Cabbage Jack
 Jonathan Paley - 'Kid
 Tracy Paul - 'Kid
 Jamilla Perry - 'Kid
 The Suits - Backing Vocals

Personnel
 Stephen Chapin - producer
 Tom Chapin - producer
 James A. Buchanan - executive producer
 William C. Coleburn - executive producer
 Jaime Chapin - production coordinator
 Keith Walsh - engineer
 Jim Regan - assistant engineer

Musicians
 Dennis Anderson - saxophone, clarinet
 Dave Bargeron - trombone, tuba
 Don Frank Brooks - harmonica
 Charlie Brown - electric guitar
 John Campo - bassoon
 Stephen Chapin - piano
 Tom Chapin - guitar, percussion
 Barbara Hart - flute
 Robbie Kondor - synthesizer, piano
 Kenny Kosek - fiddle
 Barry Lazarowitz - drums
 George Marge - bass clarinet
 John Miller - bass guitar
 Don Payne - bass guitar
 Wayne Pedzwater - bass guitar
 Georg Wadenius - electric guitar
 Eric Weissberg - banjo, steel guitar

References

External links
 A 1984 TV commercial for the Cabbage Patch Kids album Cabbage Patch Dreams

1984 albums
Children's albums
Parker Brothers